Khumrah is a small town in Makkah Province, in western Saudi Arabia. It lies just to the south of Jeddah.

See also 

 List of cities and towns in Saudi Arabia
 Regions of Saudi Arabia

References

Populated places in Mecca Province